The Dallara F308 is an open-wheel formula racing car, designed, developed  built by Italian manufacturer Dallara, for Formula Three racing categories, in 2008. It was used in different Formula Three racing categories and competitions between 2008 and 2011. It was later replaced and succeeded by the F312, in 2012.

Versions
The F308 can be upgraded to either the F309, the F310, or the F311, through Dallara's annual add-on kits. These include modifications in the area of ​​aerodynamics such as additional air deflectors or similar or improved suspension units.

The car
The F308 is a conventional Formula 3 racing car with a carbon fiber reinforced plastic monocoque, load-bearing mid-engined, and free-standing wheels. The Hewland FTR and the Pankl DGB03 gearbox are homologated for the car. It is shifted manually by means of ignition interruption and shift lever on the right side without the clutch. The front and rear wing elements, the front, and rear crash boxes, and the wheel carriers are also homologated. The bodywork can be done by the teams themselves. For example, the chimneys on the sidepods were removed from all teams in the Euroseries and the sidepods were laminated shut.

References 

Dallara racing cars
Formula Three cars